Debra Adelaide (born 1958) is an Australian novelist, writer and academic. She teaches creative writing at the University of Technology Sydney.

Biography

Adelaide was born in Sydney and grew up in the Sutherland Shire. A contemporary of writers Kathy Lette and Gabrielle Carey, she attended Gymea High School and then via a teacher's scholarship, she completed a BA (Honours) and MA (Honours) in English literature at the University of Sydney. She then completed a PhD in Australian women’s literature in 1991, and in the process completed her first book, a bibliography of Australian women's literature. While studying, Debra Adelaide worked as a university tutor and research assistant, and afterwards became a freelance editor, author and book reviewer. She commenced writing fiction in the early 1990s and her first novel, The Hotel Albatross, was published in 1995. She was married until 2003 and has three children, Joe (b 1989), Ellen (b 1992) and Callan (b 1997). She is currently an associate professor in creative practice at the University of Technology, Sydney, where she teaches in the undergraduate communication program and teaches and supervises postgraduate creative writing.

Works
Adelaide has published 12 books, including novels, anthologies and reference books on Australian literature. Her novels are The Household Guide to Dying (Picador:2008), The Hotel Albatross (Vintage: 1995) and Serpent Dust (Vintage: 1998). She has published two collections of short fiction, entitled Zebra: and other stories (Picador: 2019) and Letter to George Clooney (Picador: 2013) and also contributed to and edited the anthology Acts of Dogs (Vintage: 2003) in which leading Australian and NZ authors have written stories and memoirs on the theme of dogs, and the Motherlove series of anthologies (Random House: 1996; 1997; 1998).

Zebra won the 2019 University of Southern Queensland Steele Rudd Award for a Short Story Collection.

Bibliography

Novels
 The Women's Pages (2015)
 The Household Guide to Dying (2008)
 The Hotel Albatross (1995)
 Serpent Dust (1998)

Short Stories
 Zebra (2019)
 Letter to George Clooney (2013)

Non-fiction
The Innocent Reader: Reflections on Reading and Writing (2019)
Australian Women Writers: A Bibliographic Guide (Pandora, 1988)

As editor
The Simple Act of Reading (2015)
A Bright and Fiery Troop: Australian Women Writers of the Nineteenth Century (2008)
A Window in the Dark, autobiography of Dymphna Cusack (2008)
Acts Of Dog: Writers on the Canine Divine (2003)
Cutting the Cord: Stories of Children, Love and Loss (2002)
Motherlove 2: More Stories About Births, Babies and Beyond (1998)
Motherlove: Stories about Births, Babies and Beyond (1996)

References

1958 births
Living people
20th-century Australian novelists
21st-century Australian novelists
Australian freelance journalists
Australian women novelists
People from the Sutherland Shire
Writers from New South Wales
20th-century Australian women
21st-century Australian women writers
Australian Book Review people